Aud is a feminine given name used in Nordic countries. People with the name include:

 Aud Alvær (1921–2000), Norwegian politician
 Aud Blankholm (born 1947), Norwegian nurse and administrator 
 Aud Blattmann (born 1937), Norwegian politician
 Aud Egede-Nissen (1893–1974), Norwegian actress
 Aud Voss Eriksen (born 1937), Norwegian politician
 Aud Folkestad (born 1953), Norwegian politician
 Aud Gaundal (born 1949), Norwegian politician
 Aud Groven (born 1942), Norwegian speed skater
 Aud Gustad (1917–2000), Norwegian trade unionist and politician 
 Aud Haakonsdottir of Lade, Viking queen
 Aud Hove (born 1970), Norwegian politician
 Aud Hvammen (born 1943), Norwegian alpine skier
 Aud Korbøl (born 1940), Norwegian sociologist and novelist
 Aud Kvalbein (born 1948), Norwegian politician
 Aud Schønemann (1922–2006), Norwegian actress
 Aud Talle (1944–2011), Norwegian social anthropologist
 Aud the Deep-Minded (Ketilsdóttir), leader of settlers in Iceland
 Aud Valborg Tønnessen (born 1964), Norwegian theologian and academic
 Aud Marit Wiig (born 1953), Norwegian diplomat
 Aud Wilken (born 1965), Danish singer

As a nickname for a male 
 Aud Tuten (Audley Tuten, 1914–1994), Canadian ice hockey player

See also
 Aud (disambiguation)

Norwegian feminine given names
Danish feminine given names